Arequipa is a department and region in southwestern Peru. It is the sixth largest department in Peru, after Puno, Cuzco, Madre de Dios, Ucayali, and Loreto, its sixth most populous department, and its eleventh least densely populated department. It is bordered by the departments of Ica, Ayacucho, Apurímac and Cusco in the north, the Department of Puno in the east, the Department of Moquegua in the south, and the Pacific Ocean in the west. Its capital, also called Arequipa, is Peru's second-largest city.

Geography

This department has a rough topography, which is characterised by heavy layers of volcanic lava covering large areas of its inter-Andean sector. It has deep canyons such as the ones formed by the Ocoña and Majes rivers. Plateaus range in height from medium, such as La Joya, and high-altitude ones such the Arrieros Pampa and those located in the zones of Chivay, Huambo and Pichucolla.  Volcanic cones, such as Misti, Chachani, Ampato, Mismi, Solimana  and Coropuna,  emerge above the plateaus and attract snowfall. In contrast with these heights, there are deep canyons, including Majes, Colca, Sihuas and Ocoña, where important aspects of the ecological evolution of this zone can be clearly observed.

Along the coast, small plateaus and dunes represent characteristics of the desert of Arequipa, such as the ones located in the Majes, Sihuas and La Joya plains. These are particularly beautiful and developed.

From a hydrographic point of view, the rivers draining its territory belong mainly to the Pacific watershed.  Some rivers belong to the Amazon hydrographic system. Some of the region's main rivers are: Ocoña, Yauca, Camaná and Quilca. The starting point of the Amazon River is located in the Arequipa region .

The Highest Mountains of Arequipa are:
 Coropuna 6,425 mamsl, Ampato Range.
 Ampato 6,288 mamsl, Ampato Range.
 Solimana 6,093 mamsl, Ampato Range.
 Chachani 6,057 mamsl, Volcanic Range.
 Hualca Hualca 6,025 mamsl, Ampato Range.
 Sabancaya 5,976 mamsl, Ampato Range.
 Misti 5,822 mamsl, Volcanic Range.
 Nocarane 5,784 mamsl, Volcanic Range.
 Pichu Pichu 5,664 mamsl, Volcanic Range.
 Chila 5,654 mamsl, Chila Range.
 Casiri 5,647 mamsl, Chila Range.
 Mismi 5,597 mamsl, Chila Range.
 Minaspata 5,555 mamsl, Chila Range.
 Quehuisha 5,514 mamsl, Chila Range.
 Surihuiri 5,506 mamsl, Chila Range.
 Tacune 5,500 mamsl, Volcanic Range.
 Firura 5,498 mamsl, Ampato Range.
 Yuraccasa 5,465 mamsl, Chila Range.
 Jatunpila 5,450 mamsl, Chila Range.
 Jatun Huaychahui 5,445 mamsl, Huanzo Range

Political division

The region is divided into eight provinces (provincias, singular: provincia), which are composed of 109 districts (distritos, singular: distrito). The provinces, with their capitals in parentheses, are:
 Arequipa (Arequipa)
 Camaná (Camaná)
 Caravelí (Caravelí)
 Castilla (Aplao)
 Caylloma (Chivay)
 Condesuyos (Chuquibamba)
 Islay (Mollendo)
 La Unión (Cotahuasi)

Demographics

Languages 
According to the 2007 Peru Census, the first language learned by most of the residents was Spanish (83.17%), followed by the native language of Quechua (14.78%). The Quechua variety spoken in Arequipa is Cusco–Collao Quechua.

The following table shows the first languages by province in the Arequipa Region by province:

Ethnicity 

As of 2017, the largest ethnicity in the Arequipa region are the Mestizo, followed by the Quechua.

Religion 
In 2017, over 80% of Arequipa's population was Catholic.

Literacy 
In 2017, 91.5% (1,274,358) of the population was literate and 8.5% (118,691) of the population was illiterate.

Points of interest

There are numerous points of interest in the Arequipa region. The three coastal provinces, Caraveli, Camana and Islay all have popular beaches. Various ports can also be found along the coastline, the two most important being Mollendo and Matarani, both in the province of Islay.

The Colca Canyon, twice as deep as the Grand Canyon in the United States, is situated in the province of Caylloma. The Cotahuasi Canyon is in the La Union Province. Colca Valley provides incredible close-up views of majestic Andean condors soaring in their natural habitat. Both canyons offer spectacular scenery and villages as yet unaffected by the modern world.

In the Castilla Province near Corire, Toro Muerto (meaning "dead bull" in Spanish) is an area with more than 3,000 ancient petroglyphs dating to the ancient Wari culture of 500–1000 CE, which dominated much of this region. Further to the north near Andaguas lies the Valley of Volcanoes. Almost 100 cones of various sizes dominate the lava-hardened landscape.

See also
 2001 southern Peru earthquake
 Cotahuasi Subbasin Landscape Reserve

Sources

External links
 Arequipa region official website (in Spanish)
 Arequipa Today

Arequipa